Bianca Canizio (born February 14, 1994) is a U.S. Virgin Island soccer player who plays as a midfielder for the United States Virgin Islands women's national team.

Early life
Canizio was raised in Murphy, North Carolina. She has attended the Murphy High School in her hometown.

College career
Canizio has attended the Warren Wilson College in Swannanoa, North Carolina.

International career
Canizio capped for the United States Virgin Islands at senior level during two CONCACAF W Championship qualifications (2018 and 2022) and the 2020 CONCACAF Women's Olympic Qualifying Championship qualification.

References

1994 births
Living people
United States Virgin Islands women's soccer players
Women's association football midfielders
United States Virgin Islands women's international soccer players
People from Murphy, North Carolina
Soccer players from North Carolina
American women's soccer players
Warren Wilson Owls athletes
College women's soccer players in the United States